Chinụa Ezenwa-Ọhaeto is a Nigerian poet and academic.

Early life and education 
Chinua Ezenwa-Ohaeto was born in 1992 in Awka, Anambra State, where his father Ezenwa-Ohaeto taught at Nnamdi Azikiwe University. He grew up between Germany and Nigeria due to his father's profession. He was named after Chinua Achebe, who was his father's mentor. While growing up, Ezenwa-Ohaeto envisioned becoming an inventor but changed his mind when he started reading his father's poems. He earned his bachelor's and master's degrees in English Language and Literature at the University of Nigeria, Nsukka. He is currently a PhD student for Creative Writing at the University of Nebraska–Lincoln.

Career 
In 2009, Chinua won the ANA/Mazariyya Teen Poetry Prize as a freshman at the University of Nigeria, Nsukka. He was a runner-up in 2014 for the Etisalat Prize for Literature, flash fiction category. In 2017, he published a chapbook, The Teenager Who Became My Mother, via Sevhage Publishers. In 2018, he won the Castello di Duino Poesia Prize for an unpublished poem and was the recipient of the New Hampshire Institute of Art's 2018 Writing Award, as well as the recipient of a scholarship to the institute's MFA program, though he could not attend due to financial constraints. In 2019, he was the winner of the Sevhage/Angus Poetry Prize and second runner-up in the fifth Singapore Poetry Contest.

Bibliography 
Chapbooks
 The Teenager Who Became My Mother

References 

1992 births
Living people
21st-century Nigerian poets
Nigerian academics
Nigerian male poets
 University of Nigeria alumni